, also known as NBC, is a broadcasting station in Nagasaki Prefecture, Japan.  It founded in 1952, and it is the only commercial broadcasting that provides both TV and radio services in Nagasaki prefecture.  Nagasaki Broadcasting is affiliated with the JNN (TV),  JRN, NRN (RADIO).

Nagasaki Broadcasting started radio broadcasting in 1953.  Its radio station also cover Saga Prefecture.  NBC started television broadcasting in 1959,  and started digital terrestrial television broadcasting in 2006.  In 2021, NBC moved into its new headquarter,  and started to use new logo.

References

External links
 Official website 

Japan News Network
Television stations in Japan
Radio in Japan
Radio stations established in 1953
Television channels and stations established in 1959
1952 establishments in Japan